Bilbo Williams, nicknamed "Biggie", is an American former Negro league outfielder who played in the 1940s.

Williams played for the Baltimore Elite Giants in 1943. In six recorded games, he posted two hits in 23 plate appearances.

References

External links
 and Seamheads

Year of birth missing
Place of birth missing
Baltimore Elite Giants players
Baseball outfielders